Michele B. Chan is an American philanthropist and former actress.  She was born in East London, South Africa. Chan is currently the CEO of NantStudio, which she founded in 2015.

Acting career
She was best known for her role in the series MacGyver as Mei Jan, who impersonated MacGyver's deceased foster daughter Sue Ling. She appeared in the movie American Ninja 3: Blood Hunt and also had recurring roles in the American television series Hotel and the Canadian TV show Danger Bay.

Personal life
Chan married South African-born American billionaire surgeon, businessman, and minority owner of the Los Angeles Lakers Patrick Soon-Shiong in 1977. They have two children, including Nika Soon-Shiong, an activist. In 2018, they became co-owners of the Los Angeles Times after purchasing the newspaper.

References

External links
 

Living people
20th-century American actresses
20th-century American philanthropists
American actresses of Chinese descent
American film actresses
American television actresses
Year of birth missing (living people)